May Bukas Pa is a 2009–2010 Philippine religious-themed television series, inspired by the 1955 Spanish film, Marcelino pan y vino. Directed by Jerome Chavez Pobocan, Jojo A. Saguin, and Erick C. Salud, it is topbilled by Zaijian Jaranilla together with an ensemble cast. The series originally aired on ABS-CBN's Primetime Bida evening block from February 2, 2009 to February 5, 2010 replacing Eva Fonda, with a total of 263 episodes and 38 chapters.

Series overview

Episodes

2009

Chapters 1–9 (Episodes 1–21)

Chapters 3–9 (Episodes 22–48)

Chapters 9–29 (Episodes 49–160)

Chapters 28–29 (Episodes 161–195)

Chapters 29–34 (Episodes 196–237)

2010

Chapter 34 (Episodes 238–240)

Chapters 34–35 (Episodes 241–248)

Chapter 36 (Episodes 249–253)

Chapter 37 (Episodes 253–259)

Chapter 38 (Episodes 260–263)

References

External links

May Bukas Pa TFCnow
May Bukas Pa ABS-CBN

Lists of children's television series episodes
Lists of Philippine drama television series episodes
2000s television-related lists
2010s television-related lists